Tuyunga or Tujunga (Tongva: Tuhuunga, “place of the old woman”) is a former Tongva (Fernandeño) village now located at Sunland-Tujunga, Los Angeles in Los Angeles County, California. The village was located near the original Rancho Los Encinos that became the Mission San Fernando Rey de España in the San Fernando Valley.

People of the village frequently intermarried with people from neighboring Chumash villages. The nearby valley renamed Crescenta Valley by the Spanish was potentially used as a seasonal hunting location with access to the waters of the canyon. The Tongva regularly cultivated plants in the region, as reported by a Spanish survey of the area in 1795, who sought to exploit the site for the construction of another mission.

Toponymy 
The village name is referred to in the following places:

 Big Tujunga Creek, major stream in Los Angeles County
 Big Tujunga Dam, dam in Los Angeles County
 Sunland-Tujunga, Los Angeles, a neighborhood in the city of Los Angeles
 Tujunga Wash Greenway, a cycling route
 Tujunga Wash, a tributary of the Los Angeles River
 Rancho Tujunga, a former rancho

See also
Tovaangar

References

Tongva
San Fernando Valley
Former settlements in Los Angeles County, California
Former Native American populated places in California
Former populated places in California
Tongva populated places
Native Americans in Los Angeles